Dany Boon (born Daniel Farid Hamidou on 26 June 1966) is a French -American actor, film director, screenwriter and producer.

Starting out as a comedian during the 1990s, he found success in 2008 as an actor and director in the film comedy Welcome to the Sticks. Since then he has been involved as screenwriter or director or both in the films Nothing to Declare (2011), Supercondriaque (2014), Raid dingue (2017) and La Ch'tite famille (2018).

Early life
Boon was born Daniel Farid Hamidou in a middle-class family in northern France. His father was born in 1930 in Issers, Algeria, and was Muslim, and died in Lille, France in 1992. He was a boxer and a chauffeur. Boon's mother, Danièle Ducatel, is from northern France. A Catholic, she was a stay-at-home mother.

He converted to Judaism (his wife's faith) in 2002.

He studied graphic arts at the Institut Saint-Luc in Belgium.

Career
Boon arrived in Paris in 1989, where he was a mime in the streets for a living while appearing frequently on open mic nights at places like the Treviso theatre. He borrowed his stage name from a hero in the American television series Daniel Boone, which was about an American trapper.

He acted in several one-man shows.

Boon is also a musician; he has done a version of "Piensa en mí" ("Think of me").  He also writes his own songs, for example, "Le Blues du 'tiot poulet" ("The Chicken Blues").

After small roles in movies during the 1990s, he landed a role in the 1998 satire Bimboland, directed by Ariel Zeitoun. Boon is deeply attached to his native region, Nord-Pas-de-Calais. In 2003, he made a whole show in the local dialect of ch'ti, also known as Picard. Despite the use of dialectal language, 600,000 copies of the DVD (which included French subtitles) were sold. No previous DVD featuring a one-man show had sold as well in France. In 2004, he was part of the main cast in Pédale Dure, directed by Gabriel Aghion, a critical and commercial flop. He was then offered several roles in movies, notably in the film Joyeux Noël (Merry Christmas), which was released internationally in 2005.

In February 2008, he acted and directed a movie titled Welcome to the Sticks (Bienvenue chez les Ch'tis), which was a success in France and in other countries. This comedy based on prejudices held about the region, went on to break French box office records. Two weeks after its release, the film had already been seen by five million people. After its fourth week, the figure had risen to 15 million, and by 11 April, the film had surpassed the viewing audience of La Grande Vadrouille, having been watched by more than 17.4 million people. He was the highest-paid actor in European film history, netting 26 million Euro (c. 33 million dollars). He was the president of the 40th César Awards ceremony in 2015. Boon was on the council of directors of the Pathé production company and has produced several films as actor, co-producer, screenwriter or director. Boon had several production companies, including 26 DB Productions, in Los Angeles, California. They produce and distribute films and TV content.

Boon was also directed by French filmmakers such as Jean-Pierre Jeunet in the 2009 movie Micmacs; Danièle Thompson in 2009 Change of Plans; A Perfect Plan 2012 film directed by Pascal Chaumeil, Julie Delpy's movie Lolo (2015) and Yvan Attal in 2016 film The Jews.

Raid Dingue was a 2016 comedy that was a big success with the viewers but failed to convince film critics. He was both screenwriter and director on this movie, and also starred in it. For this film Boon received the first  César du public in the history of French cinema: this new award is given to the French film with the biggest box office of the year. After Raid Dingue, Boon did his sixth movie, (La Ch’tite Famille) Family is Family. It came out in 2018, the 10 year anniversary of Bienvenue chez les Ch’tis.

In 2016 Boon starred in a film about anti-semitism in France, The Jews. In 2018,  his Netflix show, Des-hauts-de-France premiered on Netflix. Boon voices the character of Olaf in the French dubbings of the Disney movies Frozen, Frozen 2, and The Adventures of Olaf ".

Personal life
He has four sons and a daughter from three different unions. With his first wife, he had Mehdi, his eldest son, born in 1997. With his second wife, Judith Godrèche, he had Noé, born on 4 September 1999. With his third wife, Yaël Harris, for whom he converted to Judaism in 2002, he had Eytan, born 23 June 2005; Elia, born 20 December 2006 and Sarah, born 1 March 2010.

In July 2022 Boon stated that that he was defrauded of €6 million by Irishman Terry Birles and was taking court action.

Filmography

One-man shows 
 Je vais bien, tout va bien (1992)
 Chaud mais pas fatigué ( Café de la Gare, 1993)
 Dany Boon Fou ? Théâtre Tristan-Bernard, Paris, 1994)
 Dany Boon au Théâtre du Rond-Point (1995–1996)
 Les Zacros de la télé (1996)
 Tout entier (1997)
 Nouveau spétak (1998).
 Au Bataclan (1998)
 A French comedian lost in L.A. ( Melrose Theatre, Los Angeles) (2000)
 En parfait état (2001)
 A s'baraque et en ch'ti (2003)
 Waïka (novembre 2006)
 Trop stylé (novembre 2009)
 Dany Boon: Des Hauts-De-France (avril 2018)

Plays 
 La Vie de chantier (2003)
 Le Dîner de Cons (2007, théâtre de la Porte Saint-Martin)

References

External links

1966 births
Living people
Berber Jews
Converts to Judaism
Jewish French comedians
French male film actors
French male stage actors
Jewish French male actors
French people of Kabyle descent
Kabyle people
French stand-up comedians
People from Armentières
French male television actors
20th-century French male actors
21st-century French male actors
French male screenwriters
French screenwriters
French film directors
Picard language